The Georgia national rugby union team (Georgian: საქართველოს მორაგბეთა ეროვნული ნაკრები), nicknamed The Borjgalosnebi (The Men of the Borjgali i.e. the traditional Georgian seven-armed solar symbol) or more commonly as The Lelos (from the ancient but still popular traditional Georgian folk-sport of Lelo burti, a sort of rugby played with a pumpkin-shaped ball), represents Georgia in men's international rugby union. The team is administered by the Georgian Rugby Union and takes part in the annual Rugby Europe Championship and the Rugby World Cup, which takes place every four years.

Georgia is currently considered a second-tier rugby union nation and is one of the world's fastest-growing rugby nations. The Lelos participate in the Rugby Europe Championship, winning the tournament in 2001 and every year since 2006-08, with the exception of 2017. The bulk of the national squad are based in France, in both the Top 14 and lower divisions. This is a practice that was popularised by the former national team coach, Claude Saurel, a French
Rugby is one of the most popular sports in Georgia. The national team qualified for the Rugby World Cup five times, first in 2003 – playing against rugby powers such as England and South Africa. The Lelos won their first ever World Cup match in 2007, when they beat Namibia 30–0. Since 2013, Georgia has hosted the World Rugby Tbilisi Cup.

Honours
 Rugby Europe International Championship 
 Winners (14): 2001, 2006-08, 2008-09, 2011, 2012, 2013, 2014, 2015, 2016, 2018, 2019, 2020, 2021, 2022, 2023 (record)
 Antim Cup
 Winners (16): 2005, 2007, 2008, 2009, 2011, 2012, 2013, 2014, 2015, 2016, 2018, 2019, 2020, 2021, 2022, 2023 (record)

History

Soviet era
There were several unsuccessful attempts to introduce a rugby union into Georgia, the earliest known being in 1928, with subsequent attempts also in 1940 and in 1948. Rugby was introduced to Georgia by Jacques Haspekian, an Armenian man from Marseilles in France who taught the game to students in the late 1950s through to the mid-1960s, although he then subsequently returned in France. He is still alive and living in Marseilles, he was interviewed on French radio on the occasion of Georgia playing France in the 2007 Rugby World Cup. The first rugby session was held on 15 October 1959 in Tbilisi, at the racecourse, where 20 people attended the meeting. The first Georgian club formed was the GPI (Georgian Polytechnical Institute), now known as "Qochebi".

Rugby's popularity in Georgia might be explained by its resemblance to the traditional Georgian game named "Lelo" or "Lelo Burti" (meaning "Field Ball"). This game was played in Georgia from ancient times and is still played on occasions in rural areas. A field ("Lelo") was selected between two river creeks which represented a playing ground. Two teams, usually consisting of the male population of neighboring villages, would face each other. The number of players from each side was not set, but included any able men each village could summon. A large, heavy ball was placed in the middle of the field and the goal of the game was to carry it over the river creek of the opposing side.

The first teams appeared in 1959. The Georgia Rugby Union was founded in 1964, but until the late 1980s it was part of the Soviet Union's rugby federation. The rugby union connection between France and Georgia started as links were established by the then powerful French Communist Party and many other left-wing organisations. Georgia initially did not have its own team and its best players would play for the USSR team.

In 1988 Georgia produced their first national sevens side. In September 1989, Georgia got together with other FIRA countries to host a tour by Zimbabwe. Zimbabwe's first match on the tour was in the wet against Georgia in Kutaisi, west of Tbilisi, which Georgia won 16–3. The next year Georgia went to Zimbabwe where they played two tests, losing the first in Bulawayo and winning the second 26–10 in Harare.

1990s
On 9 April 1991 Georgia declared independence from the Soviet Union. Georgia was now a rugby union nation but getting matches was not easy: the old Soviet team continued under the name Commonwealth of Independent States. Georgia were limited to the odd game against Ukraine until they gained membership of the World Rugby in 1992.

French coach, Claude Saurel, first arrived in Georgia in 1997 with a brief to assess the standard of sport; he and his development team have helped boost the profile of the sport. Saurel went on to work with the Georgia national rugby sevens team, until he was appointed as the national coach in the summer of 1999.

Georgia's 1998 loss to Romania saw them play a two legged repechage play-off against Tonga to qualify for the 1999 World Cup. On that occasion Georgia lost the first leg 37–6 in Nukualofa before a 28–27 win in Tbilisi. This was not enough and Georgia failed to qualify.

2000s: World Cup play

After France and Italy dropped from the reborn European Nations Cup, Georgia became a major force in the tournament. In 2000, Georgia finished second in the competition, finishing behind Romania. The following year, Georgia improved upon this, winning all five of their matches during the 2000–01 tournament, and thus finishing at the top of the table. They clinched the title by beating Romania away 31–20 on the final day.
Rugby union took off in the country, the travel and opportunities to land lucrative contracts in France made rugby union a glamorous pursuit in Georgia. Georgia placed second in the 2001–02 tournament. When Georgia played Russia in the European Nations Cup 65,000 people crammed into the national stadium in Tbilisi.

Georgian first made an impact at Rugby Sevens by finishing a respectable 10th in the 2001 edition of the Rugby World Cup Sevens in Argentina.

In October 2002 Georgia faced Russia, in what was at the time one of the most important clashes ever between the two national sides. The victorious nation would head to the 2003 Rugby World Cup, and the loser would be relegated to fight it out for a repechage position. Neither nation had ever been to a World Cup, though Georgia had come close in 1999. 50,000 spectators turned out to the national stadium. Both nations kicked penalty goals in the first half, but Russia moved ahead with a 13–9 lead through a try, but Georgia were able to score a try of their own just before half time, with Levan Tsabadze putting them in front 14–13 at the break. Georgia held on, winning 17–13, a victory which sparked celebrations throughout the capital. Three of the 75 French-based Georgian players were denied permission to play in the tournament and were suspended. Another five were sacked and arrived in Australia as free agents. In a warm-up game held in Asti the Georgians lost to Italians 31–22.

In the 2003 Rugby World Cup, Georgia were grouped into pool C alongside giants – South Africa and England. They suffered their heaviest ever defeat when beaten by England 84–6 in their opening game. In their second match, Samoa comfortably eased to a 46–9 victory. Although they performed well against the Springboks (losing 46–19) they were disappointingly defeated by Uruguay 24–12, in a match that they were expected to win. They lost all four of their matches but had impressed against South Africa. Despite the sad financial state of their union, qualification has seen the sport's profile rise throughout Georgia.

In the 2007 Rugby World Cup Georgia were drawn against Argentina, Ireland, Namibia and tournament hosts France in Pool D.
The team recorded their first win in the rugby world cup with a 30–0 win over Namibia in their Pool D match at Stade Felix-Bollaert. The foundation for the victory was laid by Georgia's experienced forward pack who wore down their opponents at the breakdown. The 2007 world cup campaign is also well remembered for Georgians by a brilliant display against Ireland, where Georgia narrowly lost the match 10–14. The tournament was over with 7–64 defeat to hosts France on 30 September.

2010–present

At 2011 Rugby World Cup, Georgia's Pool B included England, Argentina and Scotland, as well as local rivals Romania. Despite the close nature of their pool, Georgia were impressive in all matches, including a tight match against Scotland which was lost 15–6, thus missing a bonus point narrowly and a 41–10 loss against England, which featured a man-of-the-match performance by flanker Mamuka Gorgodze. Georgia went on to record only their second ever Rugby World Cup win against Romania, winning 25–9 with another man-of-the-match performance by Mamuka Gorgodze. Georgia finished their campaign with a strong showing against Argentina, leading 7–5 at half time before conceding 20 unanswered points to lose 25–7. Thus Georgia finished their campaign with 1 win and 3 losses.

In the 2015 Rugby World Cup Georgia played against Tonga, Argentina, title holders New Zealand and the top African qualifier Namibia in Pool C.
The group opener finished with Georgia's 17–10 victory against Tonga. their third win in a World Cup match.
Georgia lost their second match against Argentina 9–54, after trailing 14–9 at half-time. In the third match Georgia were defeated by New Zealand 43–10 in Cardiff. Again in the first half The Lelos held very well against the All Blacks, trailing the world champions 22–10. 
In the last match Georgia defeated Namibia 17–16 to finish third, their highest in a world cup, and securing their qualification for 2019 Rugby World Cup at the same time.

In 2016, Georgia once again cemented its claim to be the seventh best national rugby team in Europe, when they won the European Nations Cup for the sixth consecutive time, with 10 wins from 10 matches. In the 2016 mid-year internationals the Lelos traveled to the Pacific islands for the first time and finished the historic tour unbeaten with 19–19 draw against Samoa, 23–20 victory against Tonga and 14–3 victory against Fiji.

In July 2022, Georgia beat a Tier 1 nation for the first time, Italy, 28-19.

In November 2022, Georgia beat Wales 13-12 in Cardiff.

Lelo

Lelo or lelo burti, literally a "field ball [playing]", is a Georgian folk sport, which is a full contact ball game, and very similar to rugby. Within Georgian rugby union terminology, the word lelo is used to mean a try, and the popularity of rugby union in Georgia has also been attributed to it. In 2014,  lelo burti, along with khridoli, a traditional martial art, was inscribed by the government of Georgia as a "nonmaterial monument" of culture.

It appears in the 12th century Georgian epic poem The Knight in the Panther's Skin in which the characters play lelo burti.

Kits

Home kit

Away kit

Record

Wins against Tier 1 nations

Overall 

Georgia has won 150 of their 244 representative matches, a winning record of 61.48%. Since World Rankings were introduced by World Rugby in September 2003, Georgia have occupied below number ten the majority of the time.

Below is a table of the representative rugby matches played by a Georgia national team at test level up until 20 November 2022.

World Cup

Georgia has competed in five Rugby World Cup tournaments. Their first appearance was in 2003 when they were placed in Pool C with England, South Africa, Uruguay and Samoa. In 2007 Georgia recorded their first win in the Rugby World Cup with a 30–0 win over Namibia in their Pool D match at Stade Bollaert-Delelis. The Lelos best performance was in 2015, where they finished third in a group for the first time. Georgia have to date won four World Cup matches and lost twelve.

Rugby. Georgian all tournament games

Rugby European Championships
Georgia compete annually in the Rugby Europe Championship (previously named European Nations Cup). They have won the tournament 14 times in 2001, 2008, 2009, 2011, 2012, 2013, 2014, 2015, 2016, 2018, 2019, 2020, 2021 and 2022

Results correct up until 7 July 2021

Antim Cup

The Antim Cup is contested between Georgia and Romania each time the teams meet in a senior international match other than World Cup matches or qualifiers. The holder retains the cup unless the challenger wins the match, and there is no extra time in case of a draw. It is named after the Romanian Orthodox Metropolitan Anthim the Iberian, who came from Georgia.

Players

Current squad
On the 27th of January 2023, the following 36 players were called up for the 2023 Rugby Europe Championship.

Head Coach:  Levan Maisashvili
 Caps updated: 2 February 2023

Recent call-ups
The following players have been called up for the team in the last six months.

Notable former players

Mamuka Gorgodze – Switched to rugby from basketball aged 17. His first club was Lelo in the Georgian Top League, he was soon selected for the Georgia national team and made his debut in 2003 against Spain, at the age of just 18 and not long after he started playing rugby. However he was not selected for Georgia's first appearance at the 2003 Rugby World Cup later that year. In 2004 he became a regular fixture for the Georgia side. He was a regular in the Georgia side though and was selected for the 2007 Rugby World Cup, and started three of Georgia's four matches at the World Cup, being one of Georgia's star players. Gorgodze became a success as flanker during this season, and halfway through the season French newspaper L'Équipe commented that he improved his technique and became a mobile and unstoppable player. Gorgodze played a big role in Montpellier finishing the 2010–11 Top 14 season as runners up. At the end of the season L'Équipe named him as the best foreigner in the league. He was selected for the Georgia squad for the 2011 Rugby World Cup and played all the Georgia matches, being named man of the match in two matches, against England and Romania.

Davit Zirakashvili - originally came from a wrestling background, but switched to rugby in 2000. He moved to France in 2002 to play with Fédérale 1 side Aubenas. He moved up the leagues to the Top 14 in the 2004/05 season to play with Clermont where he joined his Georgian compatriot Goderdzi Shvelidze. He also made his debut for Georgia in 2004 against Uruguay. He soon became an important member of both the Clermont and Georgia side. He played in all four of the consecutive Top 14 finals Clermont reached between 2007 and 2010, he scored a try in the 2008 Top 14 final against Toulouse and in 2010 became the first Georgian player to win the Top 14, and represented Georgia in both the 2007, 2011 and 2015 World Cups. In 2010, Zirakashvili was voted Georgian sportsman of the year after some crucial performances for both club and country. He was part of a Georgian scrum which scored three penalty tries and also a pushover try in the calendar year, he also a memorable solo try from 45 metres out against Russia in Trabzon and an important try against Canada. His scrummaging was a key factor in Georgia recording wins against both Canada and USA for the first time, whilst at club level he was part of Clermont's Top 14 winning side. Zirakashvili was also mentioned as one of the best tighthead props of the year in world rugby by The Daily Telegraph.

Ilia Zedginidze – Played as a Number 8 and was a lineout specialist. A member of their inaugural World Cup side in 2003, he captained Georgia in the 2007 tournament, but was forced out of the squad because of an injury. This injury ultimately led to him announcing his retirement from international rugby, after gaining 48 caps. He returned to the squad in late 2008, playing against Scotland A and taking part in the 2009 European Nations Cup, where he scored a game-saving try against Portugal on 14 February 2009.

Malkhaz Urjukashvili – Moved to France, where he has been playing. He is one of the best players and scorers for Georgia, holding currently 65 caps for his National Team, with 18 tries and 300 points. His first match was a 29–15 win over Croatia, in Tbilisi, at 12 October 1997, aged only 17 years old. This made him one of the youngest players ever to be capped at international rugby level. He was present at the 2003 Rugby World Cup, playing three matches and scoring 9 points. In the game against England, he kicked a long range penalty that registered as Georgia's first Rugby World Cup points (England eventually won the game 84–6). He was called once again for the 2007 Rugby World Cup, playing in all the four matches and scoring one conversion. He continued to be a valuable player in the 2011 Rugby World Cup qualification, the third Georgia gained in a row.

Coaches

Current coaching staff
The current coaching staff of the Georgian national team:

Player records

Most caps

Last updated: Georgia vs Romania, 5 March 2023. Statistics include officially capped matches only.

Most tries

Last updated: Georgia vs Romania, 5 March 2023. Statistics include officially capped matches only.

Most points

Last updated: Georgia vs Romania, 5 March 2023. Statistics include officially capped matches only.

Most matches as captain

Last updated: Georgia vs Romania, 5 March 2023. Statistics include officially capped matches only.

Most points in a match

Last updated: Georgia vs Romania, 5 March 2023. Statistics include officially capped matches only.

Most tries in a match

Last updated: Georgia vs Romania, 5 March 2023. Statistics include officially capped matches only.

Former coaches

See also

 Rugby union in Georgia
 Georgia U20
 Georgia U18
 Georgia XV
 Georgia 7s
 Antim Cup
 Soviet Union national rugby union team
 List of Georgia national rugby union players

References

External links
Georgian Rugby Union 
Official Facebook
Official Twitter
Planetrugby news for Georgia
 Diplomacy the key for Georgia (from BBC News)

 
Rugby union in Georgia (country)
European national rugby union teams
Teams in European Nations Cup (rugby union)